Brantly may refer to:

 Brantly International, American aviation manufacturer
 Brantly, given name
 Brantly Womack, American scholar
 Brantly, surname
 Keith Brantly, American long-distance runner
 Rob Brantly, American baseball player
 Justin Brantly, American football player
 Kent Brantly, American physician and author
 Newby O. Brantly, American inventor and entrepreneur
 Susan Brantly, American scholar
 Theodore Brantly, American jurist

See also
 Brantley (disambiguation)